Diplogasteroididae is a family of nematodes belonging to the order Diplogasterida.

Genera:
 Dirhabdilaimus

References

Nematodes